Liné Malan (born 20 June 1992) is a field hockey player from South Africa, who plays as a midfielder.

Personal life
Liné Malan was born in the United Kingdom. At the age of three, her family moved to Paarl, South Africa.

Her brother, Dawid, is an international cricketer for England.

Career

Domestic leagues
Malan has played domestically in South Africa, England and Australia.

In 2017 she was a member of the Wineland Wings in season two of the South African Premier Hockey League.

Following her move to Australia in 2018, Malan has been a regular fixture in the national league for Western Australian teams the WA Diamonds in the AHL, and the Perth Thundersticks in the Sultan Bran Hockey One League.

International career

Under–21
Liné Malan made her debut for the South Africa U–21 team in 2013 at the FIH Junior World Cup in Mönchengladbach.

National team
Malan made her debut for the national team in 2015, during a test event against Chile and Belgium in Cape Town. She followed this up with an appearance at the 2014–15 FIH World League Semi-finals in Valencia.

She last represented the national team in 2016 during the Cape Town Summer Series.

References

External links

1992 births
Living people
South African female field hockey players
Female field hockey midfielders
21st-century South African women